The Men's 50 metre freestyle S11 swimming event at the 2004 Summer Paralympics was competed on 26 September. It was won by Junichi Kawai, representing .

1st round

Heat 1
26 Sept. 2004, morning session

Heat 2
26 Sept. 2004, morning session

Final round

26 Sept. 2004, evening session

References

M